Hissein Brahim Taha is a Chadian politician and diplomat who is the 12th and current Secretary General of the Organisation of Islamic Cooperation. He briefly served in the government of Chad as Minister of Foreign Affairs in 2017.

Career
 From 1979 to 1989 he was Adviser at the Ministry of Foreign Affairs in N'Djamena.
 From 1990 to May 1991 he was director of the Office of the Minister of Foreign Affairs in N'Djamena. 
 From June 1991 to 2001 he was First Counselor at the Embassy in Riyadh.
 From 2001 to 2006 he was Ambassador to Taiwan.
 Beginning in 2006 he was Ambassador to France with coaccreditation to the Vatican City

Taha was appointed to the government as Minister of Foreign Affairs on 5 February 2017, succeeding Moussa Faki, who had been elected as Chairperson of the Commission of the African Union.

See also
List of foreign ministers in 2017

References

External Links 

1951 births
Ambassadors of Chad to China
Ambassadors of Chad to France
Living people
Foreign ministers of Chad
Organisation of Islamic Cooperation officials
Chadian Muslims